Stepnogorsk is a town in Akmola Region, Kazakhstan.

History
Stepnogorsk was established in 1959, and has been a town since 1964. It is located about 200 km North-East of Nur-Sultan. It began as a closed town with code names Tselinograd-25, Makinsk-2. The town is known as a nuclear and biochemical site, which was known as the Stepnogorsk Scientific and Technical Institute for Microbiology.

Population

References

External links 
 STEPNOGORSK Online - Unofficial web site since 1999 mirror (in Russian)
 Advertising and Information Portal town Stepnogorsk Kazakhstan (in Russian)

Cities and towns in Kazakhstan
Populated places in Akmola Region
Cities and towns built in the Soviet Union
Populated places established in 1959

Weapons test sites
1959 establishments in the Soviet Union